Michael Hills may refer to:

Michael Hills (jockey) (born 1963), British jockey
Michael Hills (rugby union) (born 1985), rugby union player

See also
Michael Hill's Blues Mob, American blues trio
Michael Hill (disambiguation)